The panamic green moray eel (Gymnothorax castaneus) is a large moray eel in the Pacific.  Common names also include chestnut moray eel.

The panamic green moray is found in the Pacific from the Gulf of California to Ecuador, including the Galapagos Islands.

It grows to about 1.5 m in length, and is brown to brownish green.
  It is found near reefs and  associated waters between 3 and 36 m deep.

References

External links
 

castaneus
Marine fauna of the Gulf of California
Western Central American coastal fauna
Galápagos Islands coastal fauna
Fish described in 1882
Taxa named by David Starr Jordan